Grand Falls Airport  is a private airfield located  northeast of Grand Falls, New Brunswick, Canada.

The airport is classified as an airport of entry by Nav Canada and is serviced by the Canada Border Services Agency (CBSA). CBSA officers can handle general aviation aircraft only, with no more than 15 passengers.

References

External links
Grand Falls Aviation

Registered aerodromes in New Brunswick
Buildings and structures in Victoria County, New Brunswick
Grand Falls, New Brunswick
Transport in Victoria County, New Brunswick